"Same Ol' Love" is a song written by Chris Austin and Greg Barnhill, and recorded by American country music artist Ricky Skaggs. It was released in December 1991 as the second single from his album My Father's Son.  The song reached number 12 on the Billboard Hot Country Singles & Tracks chart in April 1992.

Chart performance

References

1991 singles
Ricky Skaggs songs
Epic Records singles
1991 songs
Song recordings produced by Brian Ahern (producer)
Song recordings produced by Ricky Skaggs
Songs written by Greg Barnhill